Optic Nerve may refer to:

Optic nerve, the anatomical structure
Optic Nerve (GCHQ), a mass surveillance program run by the British intelligence agency GCHQ
Optic Nerve (comics), a comic book series
Optic Nerve (CD-ROM), a Red Hot Benefit Series tribute to David Wojnarowicz
Optic Nerve Studios, a special make-up effects studio run by Glenn Hetrick